This is a list of Honorary Fellows of New College, Oxford.

Sir Michael Atiyah
Nicolas Barker
Katharine Birbalsingh
James Bowman
Peter Brown
Shona Brown
Sir David Butler
Thomas P. Campbell
Sir Suma Chakrabati
Sir Roger Elliott
Andrew Garrad
Sir John Gieve
Robert Goff, Baron Goff of Chieveley
Hugh Grant
Irfan Habib
Christopher Hampton
David Hannay, Baron Hannay of Chiswick
Tony Honoré
Michael J. Hopkins
Ioan James
Nicola Lacey
Dame Hermione Lee
Sir Christopher Llewellyn Smith
Sir David Lumsden
Neil MacGregor
Sir Jeremy Morse
Anna Christina Nobre
Alice Oswald
Beresford Parlett
Maurice Platnauer
Sir Curtis Price
Susan Rice
Sir Bernard Rix
Neil L. Rudenstine
Alan Ryan
Sir John Stephenson
Marc Tessier-Lavigne
Sir Nicholas Underhill
Sara Weller
Sir Peter Westmacott
Stanley Whittingham
John Edgar Wideman

References

 
New College, Oxford
New College